In algebraic geometry, a Todorov surface is one of a class of surfaces of general type introduced by  for which the conclusion of the Torelli theorem does not hold.

References

 

Algebraic surfaces